The House of Federation is the upper house of the bicameral Federal Parliamentary Assembly, the parliament of Ethiopia. It has 112 members.

Each Nation, Nationality and People shall be represented in the House of the Federation by at least one member. Each Nation or Nationality shall be represented by one additional representative for each one million of its population (Article 61:2 of the constitution).

Members of the House of the Federation shall be elected by the State Councils. The State Councils may themselves elect representatives to the House of the Federation, or they may hold elections to have the representatives elected by the people directly (Article 61:3 of the constitution).

Committees 

The House of Federation has two committees and a Council of Constitutional Inquiry. Each committee consists of fifteen members including a chairperson. The two committees are the Regional & Constitutional Affairs and Budget Subsidy & Revenue Affairs.

Committee for Regional & Constitutional Affairs 
The Committee for States' Affairs is responsible for taking measures that promote unity with the consent of peoples and manages the implementation of the rights of nations and nationalities that fall under the jurisdiction of the House of the Federation. With the approval of the House Speaker, it creates committees to resolve disputes or misunderstandings that occur between states and failed to reach an agreement at the state level. It's the committee's duty to present a report to the House for Federal intervention if any state, in violation of the Constitution, endangers the constitutional order. The Committee also responsible for Legal Affairs identified civil cases that need to be incorporated into the code. It also has the duty of coming up with issues that require a constitutional amendment and reviewing similar cases to present recommendations to the House. It is also responsible to see that the rights of deputies aren't infringed and to identify other disciplinary actions the house should take when the quorum for House Sessions repeatedly fails to materialize.

Budget Subsidy & Revenue Affairs Committee 
The job of this committee is to present recommendations in determining the division of revenues derived from joint federal and state tax sources which is proposed by the executive branch and the subsidies that the federal government may provide to the states. The committee conducts a thorough review and presents a report in cases where conflicting issues arise in the division of revenues. In consultation with the House speakers, it names a committee to draft the budget of the House and performs a follow-up that this is done at the right time.

Speakers of the House of Federation

See also 

 House of Peoples' Representatives (lower house of the Federal Assembly)

References

External links
 House of Federation 

1995 establishments in Ethiopia
Ethiopia
Government of Ethiopia